Ngonye Solar Power Station (NSPS), is a  solar power plant in Zambia. The solar farm that was commercially commissioned in April 2019, was developed and is owned by a consortium comprising
Enel Green Power of Italy, a multinational renewable energy corporation, and the Industrial Development Corporation of Zambia (IDC), a parastatal company. The power station cost about US$40 million to develop.

Location
The geographical coordinates of Ngonye Solar Power Station are 15°31'03.0"S, 28°25'44.0"E (Latitude:-15.517500; Longitude:28.428889), situated immediately south of Bangweulu Solar Power Station.

Overview
The Government of Zambia, through IDC Zambia, working with the World Bank Group, as part of the bank's program "Scaling Solar",  awarded the tender to develop this power station to Enel Green Power (EGP), a renewable energy subsidiary of Enel, the Italian multinational manufacturer and distributor of electricity and gas. EGP and IDC formed an ad-hoc joint venture company, Ngonye Power Company Limited, to design, build, own and operate this power plant. The energy generated here will be purchased by Zambia Electricity Supply Corporation Limited (ZESCO), under a 25-year power purchase agreement (PPA), at US$0.078 per kWh.

Ownership
This power station is owned by a consortium whose members are illustrated in the table below. The members of the consortium formed a special purpose vehicle company Ngonye Power Company Limited, which operates and maintains the power station.

Funding, construction and timeline
The table below illustrates the sources of funding for this renewable energy infrastructure project:

 Note: Some figures are rounded up to balance table totals.

Construction began in August 2018, and commercial commissioning was achieved in April 2019.

See also

List of power stations in Zambia
Bangweulu Solar Power Station
Ngonye Hydroelectric Power Station

References

External links
 Scaling Solar: The Complete Package

Power stations in Zambia
Kafue District
Lusaka Province
Solar power stations in Zambia
2019 establishments in Zambia
Energy infrastructure completed in 2019